The Lost Tapes – Remixed is a 2015 remix album released by Kosmo Records featuring songs recorded by English singer Sam Smith in 2008. The songs were recorded for their unreleased first album, Sam Smith Diva Boy (2008).

Background
In 2008, Smith had signed a deal with Venus & Mars Music, a small UK independent label and was given to record songs by songwriting team of Victoria Hemmings, William John Pearce and John Conlon. The first of Smith's recordings to see the light of the day would be "Bad Day All Week", a song written in mid '90s. Ahead of its scheduled release as a single, the decision was made to create a series of dance and club mixes of the song. The single was released in August 2008 with remixes by Kinky Roland and Per QX. A music video was also released but the song failed to make much of an impact on the main charts. However, the remixes gain some traction on a couple of club charts and Venus & Mars Music dusted down more songs from Hemmings, Pearce and Conlon. Smith recorded "A Little Melancholy", "Show a Little Mercy" and the song that would eventually become the planned album's title track, "Time Won't Wait". They also recorded "Momentarily Mine", a ballad co-written by Lindsey Thompson.

In February 2009, Venus & Mars Music released another single in the United Kingdom, "When It's Alright". While it was a pop-soul track in its original form, "When It's Alright" had received remix treatment by Kinky Roland, Per Qx and Kid Massive, and was serviced to club DJs. The remixes transformed the song into a deep house club track. While "When It's Alright" hadn't quite broken into the mainstream, it was gaining positive reviews. Eventually, a German dance label Kosmo Records approached Venus & Mars Music and signed a worldwide license deal for the track, as well as taking an option to remix the whole of Smith's album for other territories when it was eventually released. "When It's Alright" was re-promoted in April 2009 with new remixes by German producer, Tom Novy. The track made a strong showing on the dance charts but the single, just like "Bad Day All Week", had experienced sluggish sales in the UK.

Smith had little interest in becoming predominantly a dance act. They had a passion for soul music and their dream was to sing powerful ballads and the type of uptempo pop/soul numbers Whitney Houston had made in the 1980s and 1990s, all of which seemed a long way from the tracks they had so far completed as part of the Time Won't Wait project. In 2010, Smith decided to end their association with Venus & Mars Music and walked away from the deal. However, as the deal Kosmo Records made with Venus & Mars Music gave them the right to remix any of the tracks from Smith's unreleased album, it was inevitable that they would surface once they became a marketable name.

Thus, in 2013, "When It's Alright", now completely transformed and credited to Juun featuring Sam Smith, was re-released and became a small club hit in Germany and across much of Europe. The following year, "Momentarily Mine" – the piano balled emerged, now simply titled "Moments", under the name Freddy Verano featuring Sam Smith. Radically transformed, this song had a similarly widespread release and inspired Kosmo Records to re-examine the entire Time Won't Wait project. Ultimately they commissioned remixes for every track on the album and re-named the collection The Lost Tapes – Remixed. It was released in May 2015. In August 2016, UK label Flipbook Music released the original 2008 version of "Momentarily Mine", and announced the release of the whole album with Smith's pre-fame early recordings for September 2016. Titled Diva Boy, the album was not released despite the announcement.

Track listing

Release history

References

External links
 Sam Smith .......the missing years

2015 remix albums
Sam Smith (singer) albums